Cham Zereshk-e Esperi (also Romanized as Cham Zereshk-e Esperī; also known as Cheshm-e Zereshk Esperī and Marzeh Jār) is a village in Dasht-e Hor Rural District, in the Central District of Salas-e Babajani County, Kermanshah Province, Iran. At the 2006 census, its population was 470, in 104 families.

References 

Populated places in Salas-e Babajani County